The Miss Ecuador 1988, Cecilia Pozo from Guayas, was crowned on February 15, 1988, through a casting that was held in Telecentro while she was Miss Ecuador 1988's 1st Runner-up. She was crowned by Pilar Barreiro from Pichincha, Miss Ecuador 1987. She competed at Miss Universe 1988, but she did no place. Also, Cristina López from Guayas was selected to compete at Miss World 1988.

Result

External links

Miss Ecuador